Soyol is a rural locality (an ulus) in Barguzinsky District, Republic of Buryatia, Russia. The population was 145 as of 2010. There is 1 street.

Geography 
Soyol is located 75 km northeast of Barguzin (the district's administrative centre) by road. Borogol is the nearest rural locality.

References 

Rural localities in Barguzinsky District